Waldstadion is the name of several stadia or football grounds in Germany and Austria:

Germany
 ALNO-Arena at Pfullendorf, previously known as Waldstadion an der Kasernenstraße
 Deutsche Bank Park (formerly "Commerzbank Arena") at Frankfurt am Main, home of Eintracht Frankfurt, more known as Waldstadion
 Städtisches Waldstadion at Aalen, home of VfR Aalen
 Waldstadion Feucht at Feucht, home of 1. SC Feucht
 Waldstadion Hasborn at Hasborn, home of Rot-Weiss Hasborn-Dautweiler
 Waldstadion Heeslingen at Heeslingen, home of TuS Heeslingen
 Waldstadion Homburg at Homburg (Saar), home of FC Homburg
 Waldstadion an der Kaiserlinde at Spiesen-Elversberg, home of SV Elversberg
 Waldstadion Ludwigsfelde at Ludwigsfelde, home of Ludwigsfelder FC
 Waldstadion Osterholz-Scharmbeck at Osterholz-Scharmbeck, home of VSK Osterholz-Scharmbeck
 Waldstadion Weismain, home of former Regionalliga club SC Weismain-Obermain
 Willi-Schillig-Stadion at Ebersdorf bei Coburg, previously known as Waldstadion and home of VfL Frohnlach
 Waldstadion am Erbsenberg at Kaiserslautern, home of VfR Kaiserslautern
 Waldstadion (Giessen) at Giessen, home of VfB Gießen

Austria
 Waldstadion (Austria) at Pasching, home of FC Juniors OÖ
 Waldstadion Schönau near Frankenfels, home of FCU Frankenfels